A path racer is a hybrid bicycle designed for road and track cycling,
Path is the old-fashioned  Victorian/Edwardian cycling term for track. So a path bike is purely for the track and a path racer is essentially a track bike with road geometry and 32mm Course to 38-40mm Demi-Balloon tyres used originally on unpaved roads as well as track. Path racers are characterized by high bottom bracket and track ends that is dual purpose for both road and track racing and use 120mm spacing for the rear hub, which may be fixed-gear or single-speed coaster brake, angles not quite as steep and bottom bracket lower than a pure path (track bike). Normally has the front fork crown drilled for a brake. Can also be built with mudguard clearances and mudguard eyes. They run on 28 inch (635 mm) rims. Another term for path racer is Road-Path or Road-Track.

See also
 Outline of cycling
Road bicycle
Roadster
Track bicycle

References

External links

BSA Path Racer c.1912

Cycle types